Euphylidorea is a genus of crane fly in the family Limoniidae.

Species
E. adusta (Osten Sacken, 1860)
E. adustoides (Alexander, 1927)
E. aequiatra (Alexander, 1949)
E. albipes (Leonard, 1913)
E. aleutica (Alexander, 1920)
E. aperta (Verrall, 1887)
E. auripennis (Alexander, 1926)
E. brevifilosa (Alexander, 1959)
E. burdicki (Alexander, 1964)
E. caudifera (Alexander, 1927)
E. cherokeensis (Alexander, 1940)
E. columbiana (Alexander, 1927)
E. consimilis (Dietz, 1921)
E. costata (Coquillett, 1901)
E. crocotula (Séguy, 1941)
E. dispar (Meigen, 1818)
E. epimicta (Alexander, 1927)
E. flavapila (Doane, 1900)
E. fratria (Osten Sacken, 1869)
E. frosti (Alexander, 1961)
E. fumidicosta (Alexander, 1927)
E. fuscovenosa (Alexander, 1927)
E. globulifera (Alexander, 1941)
E. insularis (Johnson, 1913)
E. iowensis (Alexander, 1927)
E. lineola (Meigen, 1804)
E. lutea (Doane, 1900)
E. luteola (Alexander, 1927)
E. meigenii (Verrall, 1886)
E. microphallus (Alexander, 1927)
E. neadusta (Alexander, 1927)
E. nevadensis (Alexander, 1958)
E. nigrogeniculata (Alexander, 1926)
E. niveitarsis (Osten Sacken, 1869)
E. novaeangliae (Alexander, 1914)
E. olympica (Alexander, 1949)
E. osceola (Alexander, 1927)
E. pacalis (Alexander, 1949)
E. paeneadusta (Alexander, 1961)
E. persimilis (Alexander, 1927)
E. phaeostigma (Schummel, 1829)
E. platyphallus (Alexander, 1926)
E. semifacta (Alexander, 1948)
E. similis (Alexander, 1911)
E. siouana (Alexander, 1929)
E. snoqualmiensis (Alexander, 1945)
E. stupkai (Alexander, 1940)
E. subadusta (Alexander, 1924)
E. subsimilis (Alexander, 1927)
E. tepida (Alexander, 1926)
E. terraenovae (Alexander, 1916)

References

Limoniidae
Nematocera genera